Roger W. Brown, Jr. (born on December 16, 1966) is a former American football defensive back in the National Football League (NFL).  He graduated from the Cardinal Gibbons School in 1986, where he letter in football. He attended college at Virginia Tech and was drafted by the Green Bay Packers in the eighth round of the 1990 NFL Draft. Brown played three seasons in the NFL, with the New York Giants in 1990 and 1991 and the New England Patriots in 1992. He won the Super Bowl with the 1990 New York Giants.

Personal
Brown lives in Silver Spring, Maryland, is married and has 3 children.  His father, Roger W. Brown, was a judge on the Circuit Court in Baltimore.

External links
Pro Football Reference

Players of American football from Baltimore
New York Giants players
New England Patriots players
Virginia Tech Hokies football players
1966 births
Living people